Corpse for the Lady is a 1964 Italian comedy film directed by Mario Mattoli and starring Sylva Koscina.

Cast
 Sylva Koscina - Laura Guglielmetti
 Sergio Fantoni - Commisario
 Scilla Gabel - Renata
 Sandra Mondaini - Marina
 Lando Buzzanca - Enzo
 Franco Franchi - Gianni
 Ciccio Ingrassia - Luigi
 Rosalba Neri - Giovanna
 Elsa Vazzoler - Costanza
 Francesco Mulé - Augusto Ferrante (as Francesco Mulè)
 Toni Ucci - Michele
 Piero Mazzarella - Tommaso Borsotti
 Angelo Santi (as Angelo Santi Amantini)
 Paolo Bonacelli - Gedeon

References

External links

1964 films
1964 comedy films
Italian comedy films
1960s Italian-language films
Italian black-and-white films
Films directed by Mario Mattoli
1960s Italian films